Thuit-Hébert is a former commune in the Eure department in Normandy in northern France.

History
On 1 January 2016, Bosc-Bénard-Commin, Bourgtheroulde-Infreville and Thuit-Hébert merged becoming one commune called Grand-Bourgtheroulde.

Population

See also
Communes of the Eure department

References

Former communes of Eure